The Department of Employment and Workplace Relations (also called DEWR) is an Australian government department formed on 1 July 2022.

History 
The department was formed by way of an Administrative Arrangements Order issued on 1 June 2022. It split the preceding Department of Education, Skills and Employment into the newly formed Department of Education and Department of Employment and Workplace Relations

Preceding departments 

 Department of Labor and Immigration (12 June 1974 – 22 December 1975)
 Department of Employment and Industrial Relations (22 December 1975 – 5 December 1978)
 Department of Employment and Youth Affairs (5 December 1978 – 7 May 1982)
 Department of Employment and Industrial Relations (7 May 1982 – 24 July 1987)
 Department of Employment, Education and Training (24 July 1987 – 11 March 1996)
 Department of Employment, Education, Training and Youth Affairs (11 March 1996 – 21 October 1998)
 Department of Employment, Workplace Relations and Small Business (21 October 1998 – 26 November 2001)
 Department of Employment and Workplace Relations (26 November 2001 – 3 December 2007)
 Department of Education, Employment and Workplace Relations (3 December 2007 – 18 September 2013)
 Department of Employment (18 September 2013 – 20 December 2017)
 Department of Jobs and Small Business (20 December 2017 – 29 May 2019)
 Department of Employment, Skills, Small and Family Business (29 May 2019 – 1 February 2020)
 Department of Education, Skills and Employment (1 February 2020 – 1 July 2022)

Operational activities 
The functions of the department are broadly classified into the following matters:

 Workforce Australia
 Employment policy, including employment services
 Labour market programmes for people of working age
 Co-ordination of labour market research
 Equal employment opportunity
 Work and family programmes
 Participation, activity test and compliance policy for participation payment recipients
 Work health and safety, rehabilitation and compensation
 Workplace relations policy development, advocacy and implementation
 Skills and vocational education policy regulation and programmes, including vocational education and training in schools
 Training, including apprenticeships and training and skills assessment services
 Training transitions policy and programmes
 Foundation skills for adults

References

Ministries established in 2022
Government departments of Australia
2022 establishments in Australia